The 2015–16 UEFA Europa League group stage was played from 17 September to 10 December 2015. A total of 48 teams competed in the group stage to decide 24 of the 32 places in the knockout phase of the 2015–16 UEFA Europa League.

Draw
The draw was held on 28 August 2015, 13:00 CEST, at the Grimaldi Forum in Monaco. The 48 teams were drawn into twelve groups of four, with the restriction that teams from the same association could not be drawn against each other. For the draw, the teams were seeded into four pots based on their 2015 UEFA club coefficients. Moreover, the draw was controlled for teams from the same association in order to split the teams evenly into the two sets of groups (A–F, G–L) for maximum television coverage.

The fixtures were decided after the draw. On each matchday, six groups play their matches at 19:00 CEST/CET, while the other six groups play their matches at 21:05 CEST/CET, with the two sets of groups (A–F, G–L) alternating between each matchday. There are other restrictions: for example, teams from the same city (e.g., Sporting CP and Belenenses, Fenerbahçe and Beşiktaş) in general do not play at home on the same matchday (UEFA tries to avoid teams from the same city playing at home on the same day, due to logistics and crowd control), and teams in certain countries (e.g., Belarus, Russia) do not play at home on the last matchday (due to cold weather and simultaneous kick-off times).

On 17 July 2014, the UEFA emergency panel ruled that Ukrainian and Russian clubs would not be drawn against each other "until further notice" due to the political unrest between the countries. Therefore, Ukrainian club Dnipro Dnipropetrovsk (Pot 1) and Russian clubs Rubin Kazan (Pot 1), Lokomotiv Moscow and Krasnodar (both Pot 3) could not be drawn into the same group.

Teams
Below are the 48 teams which qualified for the group stage (with their 2015 UEFA club coefficients), grouped by their seeding pot. They included sixteen teams which entered in this stage, the 22 winners of the play-off round, and the ten losers of the Champions League play-off round.

Notes

Format
In each group, teams played against each other home-and-away in a round-robin format. The group winners and runners-up advanced to the round of 32, where they were joined by the eight third-placed teams from the Champions League group stage.

Tiebreakers
The teams were ranked according to points (3 points for a win, 1 point for a draw, 0 points for a loss). If two or more teams were equal on points on completion of the group matches, the following criteria were applied in the order given to determine the rankings (regulations Article 16.01):
higher number of points obtained in the group matches played among the teams in question;
superior goal difference from the group matches played among the teams in question;
higher number of goals scored in the group matches played among the teams in question;
higher number of goals scored away from home in the group matches played among the teams in question;
if, after having applied criteria 1 to 4, teams still had an equal ranking, criteria 1 to 4 were reapplied exclusively to the matches between the teams in question to determine their final rankings. If this procedure did not lead to a decision, criteria 6 to 12 applied;
superior goal difference in all group matches;
higher number of goals scored in all group matches;
higher number of away goals scored in all group matches;
higher number of wins in all group matches;
higher number of away wins in all group matches;
lower disciplinary points total based only on yellow and red cards received in all group matches (red card = 3 points, yellow card = 1 point, expulsion for two yellow cards in one match = 3 points);
higher club coefficient.

Groups
The matchdays were 17 September, 1 October, 22 October, 5 November, 26 November, and 10 December 2015. The match kickoff times were 19:00 and 21:05 CEST/CET, except for six matches (certain matches in Azerbaijan, Belarus, Russia and Turkey) which were 17:00 CEST/CET. Times up to 24 October 2015 (matchdays 1–3) were CEST (UTC+2), thereafter (matchdays 4–6) times were CET (UTC+1).

Group A

Group B

Group C

Notes

Group D

Notes

Group E

Notes

Group F

Group G

Notes

Group H

Notes

Group I

Group J

Group K

Group L

References

External links
2015–16 UEFA Europa League

2
2015-16